Flame Top is a 1980 Finnish drama film directed by Pirjo Honkasalo and Pekka Lehto. It was entered into the 1981 Cannes Film Festival. The film depicts the life of the writer Algot Untola. The film was selected as the Finnish entry for the Best Foreign Language Film at the 53rd Academy Awards, but was not accepted as a nominee.

Cast
 Asko Sarkola as Algot Untola
 Rea Mauranen as Olga Esempio
 Kari Franck as Gunnar Avanto
 Esko Salminen as Arwid
 Ritva Juhanto as Kurttuska
 Ari Suonsuu as Kalle
 Tuomas Railo as Sulo Esempio
 Heikki Alho as Pikku-Pouvali
 Yuri Rodionov as Rawitz
 Galina Galtseva as Magda
 Soli Labbart as Maria Lassila
 Pirkka Karskela as Young Algot
 Markku Blomqvist as Lundberg
 Esa Suvilehto as Pöntinen
 Matti Oravisto as Commandant Carl von Wendt

See also
 List of submissions to the 53rd Academy Awards for Best Foreign Language Film
 List of Finnish submissions for the Academy Award for Best Foreign Language Film

References

External links

1980 drama films
1980 films
Finnish biographical drama films
1980s Finnish-language films
Films directed by Pirjo Honkasalo
Films directed by Pekka Lehto
1980s biographical drama films